The Lord Bishop of Leighlin was a separate episcopal title which took its name after the small town of Old Leighlin in County Carlow, Ireland.

The title is now united with other bishoprics. In the Church of Ireland, it is held by the Lord Bishop of Cashel and Ossory, whose full title is the Lord Bishop of Cashel, Waterford, Lismore, Ossory, Ferns and Leighlin. In the Catholic Church, it is held by the Lord Bishop of Kildare and Leighlin.

History
The diocese of Leighlin was one of the twenty-four dioceses established at the Synod of Rathbreasail in 1111. Following the Reformation, there are parallel apostolic successions. In the Church of Ireland, Leighlin was combined with Ferns in 1597 to form the united bishopric of Ferns and Leighlin. In the Roman Catholic Church, the see was governed by bishops or vicars apostolic, and from 1678 to 1694 it was administered by the Bishops of Kildare. The formal union of Kildare and Leighlin was decreed on 29 November 1694, thereby forming the united Diocese of Kildare and Leighlin.

Pre-Reformation bishops

Post-Reformation bishops

Church of Ireland succession

Roman Catholic succession

Notes
  Thomas O'Fihelly was bishop of both successions.

References

Leighlin
Leighlin
Roman Catholic Diocese of Kildare and Leighlin
Bishops of Kildare or Ferns or Leighlin or of Ossory
Former Roman Catholic bishoprics in Ireland